Curwen Rawlinson (3 June 1641 – 29 Aug. 1689, Warwick) was the Member of Parliament for the Lancaster constituency from 17 January until his death on 29 August of that year.

He was the first son of Robert Rawlinson, of Carke Hall, Cartmel, then in Lancashire. His mother was Jane Wilson, daughter of Thomas Wilson of Haversham Hall.

He was the father of Christopher Rawlinson the antiquary.

References

1641 births
1689 deaths